Kids from the Coal Land: A Letter to Henri Storck is a 2000 documentary film by director Patric Jean about the former mining district Borinage in the Walloon region of Belgium.

The film is a follow up/homage to Henri Storck's previous 1933 documentary about the Borinage, Misère au Borinage.

Awards
 IDFA Award for best Mid-Length Documentary (1999)

External links
 Kids of the coalmine, documentary online

2000 films
2000 documentary films
Documentary films about mining
Films shot in Belgium
Walloon culture
2000s French-language films
Belgian documentary films